The Baroque period was from the 17th century.

Baroque may also refer to:

Of the Baroque period
Baroque architecture
Baroque music
Baroque painting
Baroque sculpture

By region
Andean Baroque
Chinese Baroque
Ukrainian Baroque
Dutch Baroque
English Baroque
Flemish Baroque
French Baroque
Naryshkin Baroque
New Spanish Baroque
Polish Baroque
Sicilian Baroque
Spanish Baroque (disambiguation)
Stalinist baroque
Ukrainian Baroque

Music
Baroque (band)
Baroque (Japanese band), a Japanese rock band
Baroque (Italian band), an Italian band
Baroque (Junko Onishi album)
Baroque 2008 album by Gabriela Montero
"Baroque", a song by Malice Mizer
"Baroque", a song by Joe Satriani on his album Time Machine

Comics and games
Baroque (manga), a post-apocalyptic survival horror manga
Baroque (video game), a 1998 RPG video game
Baroque chess, a chess variant

Other uses
Baroque (grape), a French wine grape
Baroque pearl, a pearl of an irregular shape

See also
Neo-Baroque (disambiguation)
Post-Baroque

id:Baroque